Yogasana may mean:

 an Asana, a posture in hatha yoga or modern postural yoga
 in medieval usage as in the Gheranda Samhita, a cross-legged seated posture like Sukhasana